Julian Serrano Tapas is a tapas restaurant in Las Vegas, Nevada in the United States. Owned by Julian Serrano, it's located inside the Aria Resort and Casino and is Serrano's second restaurant in Las Vegas after Picasso.

History

Julian Serrano wanted to open a Spanish-style restaurant for over a decade. In 2009, MGM Resorts International offered Serrano a contract to open a restaurant at the new Aria Resort and Casino. Serrano agreed to the restaurant contract as long as he could have a tapas restaurant. Serrano traveled to Spain to find a designer for the restaurant. The design firm Gente de Valor was selected. Serrano traveled to DC to meet chef Jose Lopez Picazo, a fellow chef from Madrid. Lopez Picazo was hired as chef.

The restaurant's first menu tasting took place before the kitchen was operational. Executives from MGM and Serrano tasted between 25 and 30 dishes in 40 minutes. The restaurant opened a few weeks later to 600 guests on the first day.

Design and ambiance

The restaurant is located in the lobby of the Aria Resort and Casino. Designed by Gente de Valor and Serrano, the restaurant represents "the vibrant culture of my country" and needed "a good sense of balance" according to Serrano.

Cuisine and beverages

The restaurant serves contemporary versions of Spanish-style tapas with occasional Asian fusion influences. Dishes include paella (including a vegan option); ahi tuna tempura with seaweed salad and avocado-rocoto-mayo and ponzu sauce; marinated olives; stuffed piquillo peppers; grilled calamari; ribs made from Black Iberian pigs; salmon with truffle bechamel sauce and mushrooms; squid-ink rice with chicken and saffron, lobster with roasted red peppers; and empanadas.

The dessert menu includes torrija with salted caramel and vanilla ice cream.

The bar offers multiple types of sangria. Cocktails include the Piña Smash,  pineapple purée, simple syrup, mint and lime. The bar also serves carajillo, a Spanish after dinner drink made with xtabentún. The wine list comprises mainly Spanish wines.

Reception

Zagat rates Julian Serrano Tapas as having a 4.5 out of 5 for food and 4.4 out of 5 for decor and service. Time Out gives the restaurant 4 out of 5 stars.

References

External links

Restaurants in Las Vegas, Nevada
2010 establishments in Nevada